Giri may refer to:

People
Agam Singh Giri (1927–1971), Indian Nepali poet and lyricist
Anish Giri (born 1994), Dutch chess prodigy and grandmaster
Deepak Raj Giri, Nepalese actor, director, and producer
Gehendra Giri, Nepalese politician
Haridhos Giri, Hindu guru who disappeared in 1994
Helen Giri, Indian musicologist and historian
Kedar Prasad Giri (1944–2018), 18th Chief Justice of Nepal
Laxmi Giri (born 1955), Nepali actress
Maya Giri (born 1929), female former athlete who competed for England
Neelam Giri, Indian pediatric hematologist/oncologist
Padam Giri, Nepali communist politician
Puran Giri, Indian cricketer
Ram Bahadur Giri (born 1960), Nepalese boxer
Satyananda Giri (1896–1971), Indian monk and Yukteswar Giri's chief monastic disciple in India
Sunan Giri (born 1420), a Wali Sanga (Islamic saint) of Indonesia
Tulsi Giri (1926–2018), Prime Minister of Nepal from 1975 to 1977
V. Mohini Giri (born 1938), Indian Community service worker and activist
V. V. Giri, Varahagiri Venkata Giri (1894–1980), former President of India

Places
Giri, Iran, a village in Gilan Province, Iran
Giri, Razavi Khorasan, a village in Razavi Khorasan Province, Iran
 Giri River, a tributary of the Yamuna River in northern India
 Giri or Ngiri River, a tributary of the Ubangi River in the Democratic Republic of the Congo

Other uses
Giri (film), a 2004 Tamil film written and directed by Sundar C
Giri (Japanese), a Japanese value roughly corresponding to "duty", "obligation", or even "burden of obligation"
Giri or Kire language, spoken in Papua New Guinea
Giri/Haji, a 2019 British television series 
Genetic Information Research Institute, a private, non-profit research institution based in Mountain View, California
 Cyclone Giri of the 2010 North Indian Ocean cyclone season

See also
 Geary (disambiguation)
 Goswami